Kurt Moritz "Casey" Hageman (May 12, 1887 – April 1, 1964) was a pitcher in Major League Baseball who played between 1911 and 1914 for the Boston Red Sox (1911–1912), St. Louis Cardinals (1914) and Chicago Cubs (1914). Hageman batted and threw right-handed. A native of Mount Oliver, Pennsylvania, he was signed by the Red Sox out of Geneva College.

In a three-season career, Hageman posted a 3–7 record with 47 strikeouts and a 3.07 earned run average in 32 appearances, including 11 starts, four complete games, 18 games finished, one save, and 120.1 innings of work.

While pitching for the Grand Rapids Stags of the Ohio State League, Hageman fatally beaned Dayton Veterans second baseman Charles "Cupid" Pinkney on September 14, 1909.

Hageman died in New Bedford, Pennsylvania, at age 76.

References

External links

1887 births
1964 deaths
People from Allegheny County, Pennsylvania
Boston Red Sox players
Chicago Cubs players
St. Louis Cardinals players
Major League Baseball pitchers
Baseball players from Pennsylvania
Geneva Golden Tornadoes baseball players
Uniontown Coal Barons players
Grand Rapids Wolverines players
Denver Grizzlies (baseball) players
Jersey City Skeeters players
Denver Bears players